San Carlos City can refer to two places in the Philippines
 San Carlos, Negros Occidental
 San Carlos, Pangasinan

See also
San Carlos (disambiguation) - for many more places called San Carlos